The 1903 Ohio Medical football team was an American football team that represented the Ohio State University College of Medicine in the 1903 college football season.

Schedule

References

Ohio Medical
Ohio Medical football seasons
Ohio Medical football